"N" Is for Noose is the 14th novel in Sue Grafton's "Alphabet" series of mystery novels and features Kinsey Millhone, a private eye based in Santa Teresa, California, although much of this novel's action takes place elsewhere in California.

The novel was a New York Times best-seller.

Plot summary
The story takes place mainly in the small-town mountain community of Nota Lake, California (population 2,356, elevation 4,312), where Kinsey has inherited a client named Selma Newquist from her periodic boyfriend Robert Dietz. He is temporarily out of action back home in Carson City, where Kinsey has been taking care of him following knee surgery. Selma's brief is vague: she fears her husband Tom, a sheriff's officer who died of a heart attack a few weeks before, had something on his mind at the time of his death; and she wants Kinsey to find out what it was.

With very little to go on, Kinsey finds the residents of the insular community are not forthcoming. She finds Tom was held in high respect, while reactions to Selma range from tolerance for Tom's sake to downright dislike. Tom's colleagues in the sheriff's department, including Tom's partner Rafer LaMott and brother Macon Newquist, close ranks around his memory, though their respective wives, as well as Selma's 25-year-old son by her first marriage, Brant, are slightly more friendly and helpful to Millhone, as is CHP officer James Tennyson, who found Tom's body. A frustrating search of Tom's home office reveals nothing more than some doodling and a list of phone numbers; but it seems someone is worried about what Kinsey might find when she is first threatened by a masked driver, then attacked in her temporary accommodation, the dismal Nota Lake Cabins run by Tom's elder sister Cecilia Boden.

Retreating to Santa Teresa to lick her wounds (two dislocated fingers and a beaten-up jaw), Kinsey follows up leads from the phone numbers she found in Tom's office, from which she finds Tom was interested in the case of a petty criminal, Alfie Toth, whom he had traced to a hotel in Santa Teresa before Toth died in what might have been a murder or a bizarre suicide. Toth's unusual death has curious similarities to that of a prison associate of his, career-criminal, child-abuser, and rapist Pinkie Ritter, who died 5 years earlier but whose body only came to light near Nota Lake shortly before Toth was killed. Following up more of Tom's recent phone calls, Kinsey traces local sheriff's department officer Colleen Sellers, who had been in love with Tom, who reluctantly assists with information that Tom was suspicious that someone close to him was responsible for the deaths of both Toth and Ritter. When she also finds out that one of Ritter's daughters, Margaret, worked for Tom at the sheriff's department, Kinsey reluctantly realizes she has to return to Nota Lake to wrap up the case. Now enduring open hostility in the town and a sinister atmosphere of danger and unsure whom she can trust, Kinsey discovers that Rafer's daughter Barrett has had Tom's missing field notes since his death—but they are in code.  Belatedly, Kinsey cracks the code and realizes that the threat comes not from one of Tom's colleagues, but his step-son, Brant, who had himself been sexually abused by Ritter, killed him in retaliation, and then killed witness Toth later when he found out through Tom's investigation where Toth was. It was the realization that Brant had committed murder, and that Brant had found Toth through him, that was causing Tom's anguish before his death. Despite being unwittingly drugged by Brant in a final showdown, Kinsey manages to subdue him, much to Selma's horror.

Characters
Kinsey Millhone: Private detective who takes on a case from her sometime boyfriend, who is not in good shape to pursue it himself.

Reviews

References

External links
Sue Grafton Alphabet Series official site

Novels by Sue Grafton
Kinsey Millhone novels
1998 American novels
Novels set in California
Henry Holt and Company books